The Man Who Wouldn't Talk is a 1958 British drama film directed by Herbert Wilcox. It starred Anna Neagle, Anthony Quayle, Zsa Zsa Gabor, Dora Bryan, John Le Mesurier and Lloyd Lamble.

Synopsis
A courtroom drama, it sees an American scientist charged by the British police for his supposed role in the death of a secret agent who had been posing as his wife.

Cast
 Anna Neagle as Mary Randall, Q.C.  
 Anthony Quayle as Frank Smith  
 Zsa Zsa Gabor as Eve Trent  
 Katherine Kath as Miss Delbeau  
 Dora Bryan as Telephonist  
 Patrick Allen as Kennedy  
 Hugh McDermott as Bernie  
 Leonard Sachs as Professor Horvard  
 Edward Lexy as Hobbs  
 John Paul as Castle  
 John Le Mesurier as Judge  
 Anthony Sharp as Baker
 Lloyd Lamble as Bellamy
 Cyril Chamberlain as Liftman
 John Welsh as George Fraser

Critical reception
TV Guide wrote, "the screenplay was written by writers well versed in litigation, so the courtroom scenes have a strong sense of realism. The performances are convincing, though marred by several characters who don't fit in the plot"; while the Radio Times wrote, "courtroom dramas have an intrinsic appeal, and veteran producer/director Herbert Wilcox makes a moderately entertaining film out of this story in which Anthony Quayle's American scientist, accused of murder, refuses to testify in his own defence. Wilcox's wife, Anna Neagle, gives another of her great lady portraits as Britain's leading Queen's Counsel, demonstrating her deductive brilliance in spotting a bullet hole in a witness's window pane and her oratorical skills in a dramatic five-minute courtroom address."

References

External links

1958 films
1958 drama films
Films directed by Herbert Wilcox
British drama films
1950s English-language films
1950s British films